Derek O'Farrell (born 5 June 1983 in Toronto, Ontario) is a Canadian rower.

References 
 

1983 births
Living people
Canadian male rowers
Rowers from Toronto
Rowers at the 2012 Summer Olympics
Olympic rowers of Canada

World Rowing Championships medalists for Canada